Associated Provincial Picture Houses Ltd. v Wednesbury Corporation [1948] 1 KB 223 is an English law case that sets out the standard of unreasonableness of public-body decisions that would make them liable to be quashed on judicial review, known as Wednesbury unreasonableness.

The court gave three conditions on which it would intervene to correct a bad administrative decision, including on grounds of its unreasonableness in the special sense later articulated in Council of Civil Service Unions v Minister for the Civil Service by Lord Diplock:

Facts
In 1947 Associated Provincial Picture Houses was granted a licence by the Wednesbury Corporation in Staffordshire to operate a cinema on condition that no children under 15, whether accompanied by an adult or not, were admitted on Sundays. Under the Cinematograph Act 1909, cinemas could be open from Mondays to Saturdays but not on Sundays, and under a regulation, the commanding officer of military forces stationed in a neighbourhood could apply to the licensing authority to open a cinema on Sundays. 

The Sunday Entertainments Act 1932 legalised opening cinemas on Sundays by the local licensing authorities "subject to such conditions as the authority may think fit to impose" after a majority vote by the borough. Associated Provincial Picture Houses sought a declaration that Wednesbury's condition was unacceptable and outside the power of the corporation to impose.

Judgment
The court decided that it had no power to issue a writ of certiorari to quash the decision of the defendant simply because the court disagreed with it. For the court to adopt any remedies against decisions of public bodies such as Wednesbury Corporation, it would have to find that the decision-maker:

 had given undue relevance to facts that in reality lacked the relevance for being considered in the decision-making process.
 had not given relevance to facts that were relevant and worthy of being considered in the decision-making process
 had made a decision that was completely absurd, a decision so unreasonable that no reasonable authority could have possibly made it.

The court ruled that the corporation's conduct was not inappropriate and complied with the standards that had been set out.

As Lord Greene MR said (at 229),

Significance
The test laid down in this case, in all three limbs, is known as "the Wednesbury test".  The term "Wednesbury unreasonableness" is used to describe the third limb, of being so unreasonable that no reasonable authority could have decided that way. This case or the principle laid down is cited in United Kingdom courts as a reason for courts to be hesitant to interfere with decisions of administrative law bodies.

In recent times, particularly as a result of the enactment of the Human Rights Act 1998, the judiciary have resiled from this strict abstentionist approach, arguing that in certain circumstances it is necessary to undertake a more searching review of administrative decisions. The European Court of Human Rights requires the reviewing court to subject the original decision to "anxious scrutiny" as to whether an administrative measure infringes a Convention right. In order to justify such an intrusion, the Respondents have to show that they pursued a "pressing social need" and that the means employed to achieve this were proportionate to the limitation of the right.

The UK courts have also ruled that an opinion formed by an employer in relation to a contractual matter has to be "reasonable" in the sense in which that expression is used in Associated Provincial Picture Houses Ltd v Wednesbury Corporation: see The Vainqueur José (1979) 1 LlLR 557 and Braganza v BP Shipping Limited [2015] UKSC 17.

See also
Compare: patently unreasonable, fairness, fundamental justice and due process.
In the United States, a similarly dominant case is Chevron U.S.A. v. Natural Resources Defense Council, which describes the level of deference accorded to final legislative rulemaking made by federal agencies with the authority to do so. The legal standard most comparable to Wednesbury unreasonableness is the "arbitrary and capricious" standard applied to most regulatory decisions undertaken without trial-type procedures (those rendered after trial-type procedures must be "supported by substantial evidence").
Re Smith & Fawcett [1942] Ch 304, a company law case dealing with the control of discretion
Wednesbury unreasonableness in Singapore

Notes

External links
Associated Provincial Picture Houses Ltd v. Wednesbury Corporation

1947 in England
United Kingdom administrative case law
Common law rules
Court of Appeal (England and Wales) cases
1947 in case law
Legal tests
1947 in British law
United Kingdom constitutional case law